Morselli is an Italian surname. As of 2013, in Italy there are approximately 1,200 people with the surname Morselli, around half of whom reside in Emilia-Romagna.

Notable people
Notable people with this surname include:
 Guido Morselli (1912-1973), Italian author
 Henry Morselli, Italian physician
 Joe Morselli (1944-2006), Canadian businessman

References